April's Kittens is a 1940 picture book by Clare Turlay Newberry. When April's cat has three kittens problems arise. The book was a recipient of a 1941 Caldecott Honor for its illustrations.

References

1940 children's books
American picture books
Caldecott Honor-winning works